Tlatelolco is a metro station along Line 3 of the Mexico City Metro. It is located in the Tlatelolco neighbourhood of the Cuauhtémoc borough of Mexico City, to the north of the downtown area. It serves the Unidad Habitacional Nonoalco-Tlatelolco mega apartment complex, famous for its Plaza de las Tres Culturas square (with buildings from the pre-Hispanic, colonial, and modern eras) and infamous for the 1968 Tlatelolco massacre of demonstrating students.

The station logo depicts the tallest building in the nearby Nonoalco-Tlatelolco residential estate, the triangular Torre Insignia, which was formerly a Banobras building. The  tower houses a 47-bell carillon – a gift to the Mexican people from the citizens of Belgium. Metro Tlatelolco is directly connected with the main square of the vast, 1960s residential estate.

The station opened on 20 November 1970 with service southward towards Hospital General. Northward service towards Indios Verdes started nearly 8 years later on 25 August 1978.

Ridership

References

External links 

Tlatelolco
Mexico City Metro stations in Cuauhtémoc, Mexico City
Railway stations opened in 1970
1970 establishments in Mexico